"Ask of You" is a song by American singer Raphael Saadiq, released as a single from the Higher Learning soundtrack. It was Saadiq's biggest solo hit, peaking at number 19 on the Billboard Hot 100 and number 2 on the U.S. Billboard Hot R&B/Hip-Hop Songs chart.

In 2000, the song was sampled by Lucy Pearl in the song "Lucy Pearl's Way" from their self-titled album.

In 2005, R&B singer Mashonda covered the song for her debut album January Joy.

In 2019, the song was sampled by American rapper Wale featuring American R&B singer Jeremih in the song "On Chill" from the album Wow... That's Crazy.

References

1995 debut singles
Raphael Saadiq songs
Song recordings produced by Raphael Saadiq
1995 songs
550 Music singles
Epic Records singles
Songs written by Raphael Saadiq
Soul ballads
1990s ballads